Eliza is a bronze sculpture located in Matilda Bay on the Swan River in Western Australia. It commemorates the old Crawley Baths which were a prominent Perth landmark during the early to mid 20th century. The artwork has its own lighting from solar panels.

The public artwork was done by Perth artists Tony Jones and Ben Jones on a commission from the City of Perth and had an estimated cost of $167,000.  Jones' other pieces include the C. Y. O'Connor statue near Coogee and Sea Queen at Claisebrook Cove.

Eliza was unveiled by Peter Nattrass, Perth Lord Mayor on 15 October 2007 and has since been regularly "dressed" in various costumes by students and other unknown pranksters.  Costumes have included a Santa Claus outfit (including beard) and a Melbourne Cup frock and champagne flute.

The sculpture is named after Mount Eliza; Mount Eliza was named by Captain James Stirling in honour of the wife of Governor Ralph Darling, an early Governor of New South Wales.

See also
List of public art in Western Australia

References

External links
Public Consultation
Eliza statue gets set to have babies

Swan River (Western Australia)
Outdoor sculptures in Australia
2007 sculptures
Bronze sculptures in Australia
Statues in Australia
Sculptures of women in Australia
Crawley, Western Australia